The women's épée B wheelchair fencing competition at the 2008 Summer Paralympics was held on 16 September at the Olympic Green Convention Center.

The competition began with a preliminary stage where fencers were divided into two pools and played a round robin tournament.
In this stage, the winner of a bout was the first person to score five hits or the person with the highest score at the end of four minutes.
Next was a knock-out stage, where fencers competed in three three-minute bouts with a one-minute break between each.
The winner was the first to reach fifteen hits, or the one with the highest score at the end of the last bout.
In the event of a tie, another one-minute bout was held, with the winner being the first to score a hit.

The event was won by Chan Yui Chong, representing .

Results

Preliminaries

Pool A

Pool B

Competition bracket

References

Wheelchair fencing at the 2008 Summer Paralympics
Para